Soon kueh, also spelt soon kway is a type of steamed dumpling in Teochew cuisine. The dumpling is stuffed with julienned jicama, bamboo shoots, and dried shrimp, and is then wrapped in a skin made of rice and tapioca flour before steaming.

See also

 List of steamed foods

References

Singaporean cuisine
Steamed foods
Teochew cuisine
Dumplings